In mathematics, a nowhere continuous function, also called an everywhere discontinuous function, is a function that is not continuous at any point of its domain. Therefore, no matter how close we get to any fixed point, there are even closer points at which the function takes not-nearby values.

More general definitions of this kind of function can be obtained, by replacing the absolute value by the distance function in a metric space, or by using the definition of continuity in a topological space.

Examples

Dirichlet function

One example of such a function is the indicator function of the rational numbers, also known as the Dirichlet function. By definition,  is equal to  if  is a rational number and it is  if  otherwise. 

Functions of this type were originally investigated by Peter Gustav Lejeune Dirichlet.

Non-trivial additive functions

A function  is called an  if it satisfies Cauchy's functional equation:
 
For example, every map of form  where  is some constant, is additive (in fact, it is linear and continuous). Furthermore, every linear map  is of this form (by taking ). 

Although every linear map is additive, not all additive maps are linear. An additive map  is linear if and only if there exists a point at which it is continuous, in which case it is continuous everywhere. Consequently, every non-linear additive function  is discontinuous at every point of its domain. 
Nevertheless, the restriction of any additive function  to any real scalar multiple of the rational numbers  is continuous; explicitly, this means that for every real  the restriction  to the set  is a continuous function. 
Thus if  is a non-linear additive function then for every point   is discontinuous at  but  is also contained in some dense subset  on which 's restriction  is continuous (specifically, take  if  and take  if ).

Discontinuous linear maps

A linear map between two topological vector spaces, such as normed spaces for example, is continuous (everywhere) if and only if there exists a point at which it is continuous, in which case it is even uniformly continuous. Consequently, every linear map is either continuous everywhere or else continuous nowhere.
Every linear functional is a linear map and on every infinite-dimensional normed space, there exists some discontinuous linear functional.

Other functions

The Conway base 13 function is discontinuous at every point.

Hyperreal characterisation

A real function  is nowhere continuous if its natural hyperreal extension has the property that every  is infinitely close to a  such that the difference  is appreciable (that is, not infinitesimal).

See also

 Thomae's function (also known as the popcorn function)a function that is continuous at all irrational numbers and discontinuous at all rational numbers.
 Weierstrass functiona function continuous everywhere (inside its domain) and differentiable nowhere.

References

External links

 
 Dirichlet Function — from MathWorld
 The Modified Dirichlet Function  by George Beck, The Wolfram Demonstrations Project.

Mathematical analysis
Topology
Types of functions